Albertje Sabine Uitslag (born 4 March 1973 in Westerhaar-Vriezenveensewijk) is a former Dutch politician. As a member of the Christian Democratic Appeal (Christen-Democratisch Appèl) she was (again) an MP from 3 September 2008 to 19 September 2012. She focused on matters of social care, and addiction and youth policy.

Uitslag studied healthcare science with a specialization in nursing at Maastricht University.

References 
  Parlement.com biography

1973 births
Living people
Christian Democratic Appeal politicians
Dutch educators
Dutch women educators
Dutch nurses
Dutch rock singers
Maastricht University alumni
Members of the House of Representatives (Netherlands)
People from Vriezenveen
Protestant Church Christians from the Netherlands
21st-century Dutch politicians
21st-century Dutch women politicians
21st-century Dutch singers
21st-century Dutch women singers